Nick Waterhouse is the self-titled studio album by American singer-songwriter Nick Waterhouse. It was released in March 2019 under Innovative Leisure.

Track listing

References

2019 albums
Innovative Leisure albums
Albums recorded at Electro-Vox Recording Studios